Viktor Hamburger (July 9, 1900 – June 12, 2001) was a German-American professor and embryologist. His collaboration with neuroscientist Rita Levi-Montalcini resulted in the discovery of nerve growth factor. In 1951 he and Howard Hamilton published a standardized stage series to describe chicken embryo development, now called the Hamburger-Hamilton stages.  He was considered "one of the most influential neuroembryologists of the twentieth century".

Early life
After completing gymnasium in June 1918, Hamburger was inducted into the German army, but was released after the Armistice later that year. The army had discharged him in the city of Breslau, and he began his university studies there, moving to Heidelberg for the academic year of 1919–1920. However, in the spring of 1920 he was attracted to move to Freiburg, where he went on to complete his Ph.D. in the laboratory of embryologist Hans Spemann in 1925.

Career
Hamburger was doing post-doctoral research at the University of Chicago when the Nazis came to power in Germany, and was able to remain in the US through the assistance of the Rockefeller Foundation.

Hamburger began to work at Washington University in St. Louis in 1935; he retired from his professor position in 1969 and continued researching until the 1980s.

In 1947 Hamburger recognized and brought to the United States a post-doctoral fellow named Rita Levi-Montalcini.  Their subsequent collaboration resulted in the discovery of nerve growth factor. This work was continued by Dr. Levi-Montalcini and Dr. Cohen to which they would be awarded the 1986 Nobel Prize in Physiology or Medicine. Dr. Hamburger was excluded as a recipient for the Nobel Prize, although the NGF work by Dr. Levi-Montalcini and Dr. Cohen was based upon work by Dr. Hamburger and was carried out in his laboratory at Washington University in St. Louis. Dr. Levi-Montalcini also publicly marginalized Hamburger’s role in the NGF work.

In 1951 Hamburger and Howard Hamilton in 1951 published the Hamburger-Hamilton stages. They believed developmental biologists should have a well-grounded reference system to identify the stages of embryo development.  This would facilitate comparisons between experiments in different laboratories. The devised their stage series based on visible anatomical characteristics, chosen on the basis of clearly identifiable external features and that the successive stages should be spaced closely together as possible and include quantitative
measurements, such a beak or toe length.

In the 1960s, Hamburger did embryological work that established that chick movements in embryo were spontaneous patterns, a finding that contradicted contemporary assertions of behavioral psychologists.

Hamburger later revisited nerve growth factor, demonstrating that it was required for the maintenance of neural cells.

Selected awards
 1953 – Inducted into National Academy of Sciences
 1976 – Honorary doctorate, Washington University in St. Louis
 1978 – Wakeman Award for Research in the Neurosciences
 1981 – Ross Harrison Prize from the International Society of Developmental Biologists, shared with Donald Brown
 1983 – Louisa Gross Horwitz Prize of Columbia University with Stanley Cohen and  Rita Levi-Montalcini
 1984 – Honorary doctorate from Faculty of Mathematics and Science, Uppsala University
 1985 – Ralph W. Gerard Prize in Neuroscience from the Society for Neuroscience
 1989 – National Medal of Science
 1990 – Karl Spencer Lashley Award of the American Philosophical Society
 2000 – Lifetime Achievement Award, Society for Developmental Biology

References
Notes

Bibliography

External links 
 The Viktor Hamburger Lecture
 Viktor Hamburger Outstanding Educator Prize
 Viktor Hamburger Virtual Exhibit
 Biography of Viktor Hamburger

1900 births
2001 deaths
Men centenarians
German centenarians
German embryologists
Jewish emigrants from Nazi Germany to the United States
Jewish American scientists
Washington University in St. Louis faculty
National Medal of Science laureates
University of Freiburg alumni
People from Kamienna Góra
People from the Province of Silesia